Love Songs of Kenny Loggins is the first compilation album by American singer-songwriter Kenny Loggins. Released in 1993, it contains many of the ballad hits from Loggins' solo career.

Track listing
 "Whenever I Call You 'Friend'" (with Stevie Nicks) – 4:01
 "Celebrate Me Home" – 4:44
 "Love Will Follow" – 6:20
 "This Is It" – 3:56
 "Back to Avalon" – 5:40
 "Conviction of the Heart" – 6:51
 "Let There Be Love" – 4:05
 "Too Early for the Sun" – 8:06
 "Keep the Fire" – 4:34
 "Heart to Heart" – 5:20
 "Meet Me Half Way" – 3:39
 "Sweet Reunion" – 5:46
 "Forever" – 4:23
 "Now and Then" – 3:52

References

Kenny Loggins albums
1993 compilation albums
Columbia Records compilation albums